Nosopsyllus is a genus of fleas belonging to the family Ceratophyllidae.

The species of this genus are found in Europe, Australia and Northern America.

Species:

 Nosopsyllus abramovi (Ioff, 1946) 
 Nosopsyllus aegaeus Peus, 1978
 Nosopsyllus afghanus Peus, 1957
 Nosopsyllus alladinis (Rothschild, 1904)
 Nosopsyllus angorensis Aktas, 1999
 Nosopsyllus antakyaicus Aktas, 1999
 Nosopsyllus apicoprominus Tsai Liyuen, Wu Wenching & Liu Chiying, 1974
 Nosopsyllus aralis (Argyropulo, 1946)
 Nosopsyllus arcotus (Jordan & Rothschild, 1921)
 Nosopsyllus argutus (Jordan & Rothschild, 1921)
 Nosopsyllus atlantis Jordan, 1937
 Nosopsyllus baltazardi Farhang-Azad, 1970
 Nosopsyllus barbarus (Jordan & Rothschild, 1912)
 Nosopsyllus bunni Hubbard, 1956
 Nosopsyllus ceylonensis Smit, 1953
 Nosopsyllus chayuensis Wang Dunqing & Liu Quan, 1981
 Nosopsyllus consimilis (Wagner, 1898)
 Nosopsyllus durii Hubbard, 1956
 Nosopsyllus elongatus Li Kueichen & Shen Dingying, 1963
 Nosopsyllus eremicus Lewis, 1973
 Nosopsyllus farahae Farhang-Azad, 1973
 Nosopsyllus fasciatus (Bosc, 1800)
 Nosopsyllus fidusv (Jordan & Rothschild, 1915)
 Nosopsyllus garamanticus Beaucournu & Launay, 1988
 Nosopsyllus geneatus Traub, 1963
 Nosopsyllus gerbillophilus Wagner, 1934
 Nosopsyllus henleyi (Rothschild, 1904)
 Nosopsyllus incisus (Jordan & Rothschild, 1913)
 Nosopsyllus iranus Wagner & Argyropulo, 1934
 Nosopsyllus laeviceps (Wagner, 1909)
 Nosopsyllus londiniensis (Rothschild, 1903)
 Nosopsyllus maurus (Jordan & Rothschild, 1912)
 Nosopsyllus medus Jordan, 1938
 Nosopsyllus medus Lewis & Lewis, 1990
 Nosopsyllus mikulini (Kunitsky & Kynitskaya, 1961)
 Nosopsyllus mokrzeckyi (Wagner, 1916)
 Nosopsyllus monstrosus (Wagner, 1928)
 Nosopsyllus nicanus Jordan, 1937
 Nosopsyllus nilgiriensis (Jordan & Rothschild, 1921)
 Nosopsyllus oranus (Jordan, 1931)
 Nosopsyllus philippovi (Zagniborodova & Mikulin, 1957)
 Nosopsyllus pringlei Hubbard, 1956
 Nosopsyllus pumilionis Smit, 1960
 Nosopsyllus punensis (Jordan & Rothschild, 1921)
 Nosopsyllus punjabensis (Jordan & Rothschild, 1921)
 Nosopsyllus sarinus (Jordan & Rothschild, 1921)
 Nosopsyllus simla (Jordan & Rothschild, 1921)
 Nosopsyllus sinaiensis Smit, 1960
 Nosopsyllus sincerus (Jordan & Rothschild, 1921)
 Nosopsyllus tamilanus (Jordan & Rothschild, 1921)
 Nosopsyllus tersus (Jordan & Rothschild, 1915)
 Nosopsyllus turkmenicus (Vlasov & Ioff, 1937)
 Nosopsyllus vauceli Klein, 1963
 Nosopsyllus vlasovi (Vlasov & Ioff, 1937)
 Nosopsyllus wualis Jordan, 1941
 Nosopsyllus ziarus Klein, 1963

References

Ceratophyllidae
Siphonaptera genera